The  Damara canary (Serinus alario leucolaema) is a small passerine bird in the finch family.

Taxonomy
The taxonomic status of this bird is uncertain. It is listed by the International Ornithologists' Union as a subspecies of the black-headed canary (Serinus alario).

Description
The Damara canary is 12–15 cm in length. The adult male has rich brown upper parts and tail, a white hind collar and mainly white underparts. The head pattern is striking; whereas the male black-headed canary has a solidly black head and central breast, the Damara canary has a white supercilium, and a white throat and foreneck with a black moustachial stripe. The black of the central breast is therefore separate from the black of the head.

The adult female is similar, but has a dull grey head, and is dark-streaked on the head and upper parts. It has a rich brown wing bar. The female is similar to the female black-headed canary, but shows faint traces of the male head pattern. The juvenile resembles the female, but is paler and has streaking on the breast and a weaker wing bar.

Distribution and habitat
It is a resident breeder in South Africa, Namibia and southern Botswana.  It is sometimes placed in the genus Alario as Alario leucolaema, and some authorities treat it as a subspecies of the black-headed canary (Serinus alario).  Its habitat is dry open scrub and grassland, the edges of cultivation, and suburban gardens.

Behaviour
The Damara canary is a common and gregarious seed-eater, forming flocks of up to 200 birds. Its call is a low tseett, and the male's song is a jumble of unmusical notes.

References

 Ian Sinclair, Phil Hockey and Warwick Tarboton, SASOL Birds of Southern Africa (Struik 2002) 
 Clement, Harris and Davis, Finches and Sparrows 

Birds of Southern Africa
Serinus
Birds described in 1903

fr:Serin de Namibie